The Eastern Fleet was a World War II formation of the British Royal Navy. It was formed from the ships and installations of the East Indies Station and the China Station (which are included in this list), with headquarters at Singapore, moving between Trincomalee and Kilindini after the Japanese advances in south east Asia made Singapore untenable as a naval base. See main article for details.

The following lists the warships and support ships of the Fleet, with dates served, fate and nationality.

Battleships

Battlecruisers

Fleet aircraft carriers

Escort aircraft carriers

Heavy cruisers

Light cruisers

Anti-aircraft cruisers

Armed merchant cruisers

Destroyers

Frigates

Corvettes

Minesweepers

Monitors

Oilers

Sloops

Submarines

Gunboats

Torpedo boats

Miscellaneous

Also to be classified

References
Notes

Bibliography

 Royal navy escort carriers
 U-boat.net: records of Allied warships
 Royal Navy day-by-day in WWII
 Lemaire's Naval Encyclopedia of World War 2
 China gunboats
 Fleet Air Arm aircraft carrier database
  http://www.royalnavyresearcharchive.org.uk/BPF-EIF/index.htm

Lists of Royal Navy ships
Fleets of the Royal Navy
Military units and formations of the Royal Navy in World War II
Lists of Royal Navy units and formations
World War II orders of battle
Lists of World War II ships